Sarge is an American crime drama television series starring George Kennedy. The series aired for one season on NBC from September 1971 to January 1972.

Overview
Kennedy stars as Samuel Patrick Cavanaugh, a San Diego police detective sergeant who decides to retire and enter the priesthood after his wife is murdered. Sarge had initially studied for the priesthood prior to his police career, but his seminary studies were interrupted by military service in the Marine Corps during World War II.

The series, which ran in 1971-72, was preceded by a pilot  titled Sarge: The Badge or the Cross (February 22, 1971 airdate), which set the premise for the subsequent series. One week before the show's fall premiere, on September 14, 1971,  Cavanaugh traveled to San Francisco because of the death of a friend and fellow priest. His investigation caused him to cross paths with the characters from Ironside in a two-hour special that consolidated the two series' consecutive time slots. This has been subsequently seen as a TV-movie, The Priest Killer.

The series was set in San Diego and the pilot movie was filmed primarily on location. However, when the series went into production, episodes were filmed in Los Angeles. The parish church used was St. Peter's Italian Catholic Church on North Broadway in Chinatown.

George Kennedy's character was originally Sarge Swanson in the pilot movie. Starting with the Ironside crossover episode, and for the rest of the series, his last name was changed from Swanson to Cavanaugh. Supporting actor Ramon Bieri played Sarge's police contact.  In the pilot, his name was Chief Dewey, but was changed to Lt. Barney Verick, chief of detectives, for the series. Sallie Shockley (Valerie) and Harold Sakata (Kenji Takichi) reprised their roles from the pilot movie for the series. Henry Wilcoxon as Bishop Andrade and Dana Elcar as Father Frank Dismore also appeared in the pilot, as well as the series.

Episode list

Reception
Sarge was well received but ultimately failed by being pitted against CBS's Hawaii Five-O and The ABC Tuesday Movie of the Week.

Syndication
Since 1973, episodes have been syndicated under The Bold Ones umbrella title, and can be seen on Cozi TV; it was previously seen on the RTV network in selected areas.

See also
 Father John Blackwood "Blackie" Ryan - a similar priest character who solves crimes in novels written by Andrew Greeley
 Father Frank Dowling - priest character created by Ralph McInerny who solves crimes in several novels written by McInerny and in the subsequent TV show

References

External links
 

1971 American television series debuts
1972 American television series endings
1970s American crime drama television series
English-language television shows
NBC original programming
Television series by Universal Television
Television shows set in San Diego
American television spin-offs
American detective television series
Television series about Christian religious leaders